Alan Hyde (born 1 May 1966) is a radio broadcaster, presenter and producer and sound engineer who operates the broadcasting business, Studio 22. He is most famous for his work in motorsport journalism, particularly the British Touring Car Championship. He worked as on air contributor and producer of The Ultimate Late Show Live with Ian Collins on talkSPORT, and has since contributed motorsport previews and reports to the station.

In January 2019, Hyde took on the role of interviewer on the Main Stage at Autosport International. His predecessor was the highly respected motorsport journalist Henry Hope-Frost, and Hyde hosted an emotional tribute to his late friend.

He is part of the team behind Silverstone Circuit's radio station, Radio Silverstone, and hosts the BTCC-themed radio show Tin Top Tuesday, which has received backing from Renault, Toyota GB, Marshall Amplification and Autoglym. He also produces motorsport podcasts, including the Motor Sport Magazine podcast, and has worked regularly with BMW as an English language presenter and commentator.

References

External links
Official website

1966 births
Living people
British radio people
Motorsport announcers
British sports broadcasters